Sikti Assembly constituency is an assembly constituency in Araria district in the Indian state of Bihar.

About Sikti Assembly Constituency
The Sikti Assembly constituency of Araria district of Bihar, adjacent to the Nepal border, came into existence in 1977.  Earlier it was in Palasi Assembly constituency. Ten elections have been held here since it came into existence in 1977. Of these, Congress and BJP have been successful three times, independents twice, Janata Dal and Janata Dal United once each.
Having a strong hold in this field, Mr.  Azimuddin became the MLA here five times in 1962, 1967, 1969, 1972 and 1980 respectively and became a minister four times.  He has worked in the Chief Minister's cabinet like Harihar Prasad, Mahamaya Prasad, Daroga Prasad, Karpoori Thakur, Lalu Prasad. The special thing is that he won four out of five independent elections, three times from the then Palasi Vis and twice from Sikti.
Congress veterans Sheetal Prasad Gupta and Rameshwar Yadav have also represented this area.  At present, Vijay Kumar Mandal of BJP is the MLA. He has also been a minister in the Bihar government.  After the delimitation of 2009, there were geographical and social changes in this area.
After the delimitation, the Sikti Legislative Assembly included in the Kishanganj Lok Sabha was merged with the Araria Lok Sabha.  Earlier, in the Sikti Vis area, apart from Sikti and Kursakanta block, all the panchayats of Tedhagach block of Kishanganj district used to come, but after the delimitation, Sikti and Kursakanta were separated from Kishanganj and added to Araria.

Problems in this area

The flood erosion has troubled the people of this area. Hundreds of acres of land are cut every year from the goat and nuna flowing through the area. The rivers have destroyed many government schools and hundreds of homes.  But people have not yet got freedom from floods and erosion.

Number of voters:
Total Voters- 2,79102,
Male Voters - 1,46343,
Female Voters - 1,32752,
No. of Panchayats-37

Overview
As per Delimitation of Parliamentary and Assembly constituencies Order, 2008, No 51 Sikti Assembly constituency is composed of the following: Sikti and Kursakanta community development blocks;  Balua Kaliyaganj, Baradbatta, Chouri, Dehti North, Dehti South, Dharamganj, Dighli, Kankhudia, Pipra Bijwar and Chahatpur gram panchayats of Palasi CD Block.

Sikti Assembly constituency is part of No 9 Araria (Lok Sabha constituency) (SC).

Members of Vidhan Sabha

Election results

2020

2015

1977-2010
In the November 2010 state assembly elections, Anandi Prasad Yadav of BJP won the Sikti assembly seat defeating his nearest rival Vijay Kumar Mandal of LJP. Contests in most years were multi cornered but only winners and runners up are being mentioned. Murlidhar Mandal of JD(U)/ Independent defeated Aftab Alam Azim of LJP in October 2005 and February 2005. Anandi Prasad Yadav of BJP defeated Md. Azimuddin, Independent, in 2000. Rameshwar Yadav of Congress defeated Jamil Akhtar, Independent, in 1995, Md. Azimuddin of Janata Dal defeated Rameshwar Yadav of Congress in 1990. Rameshwar Yadav of Congress defeated Md. Azimuddin of LD in 1985. Shital Prasad Gupta of Congress defeated Md. Azimuddin of Janata Party (Secular – Charan Singh) in 1980. Md. Azimuddin, Independent, defeated Maya Nand Thakur of Congress in 1977.

References

External links
 

Assembly constituencies of Bihar
Politics of Araria district